The Fifth Street is a 1923 German silent film directed by Martin Hartwig and starring Lucy Doraine, Ernst Hofmann and Willy Kaiser-Heyl. It was screened at the Marmorhaus in Berlin.

The film's sets were designed by the art director Alfred Columbus.

Cast
 Lucy Doraine
 Ernst Hofmann
 Willy Kaiser-Heyl
 Erna Pabst
 Heinz Salfner
 Robert Scholz

References

Bibliography
 Bock, Hans-Michael & Bergfelder, Tim. The Concise CineGraph. Encyclopedia of German Cinema. Berghahn Books, 2009.

External links

1923 films
Films of the Weimar Republic
German silent feature films
Films directed by Martin Hartwig
German black-and-white films
1920s German films